Sun Club was an American rock band from Baltimore, Maryland. They were signed to ATO Records.

History
Sun Club formed in 2015, releasing their debut full-length album on October 30th of that year, titled The Dongo Durango.  In April 2017, Sun Club announced via Facebook that they were breaking up.

Band members
Mikey Powers – vocals/guitar
Adam Shane – bass guitar
Devin McCord – drum/snare&toms
Kory Albert Johnson – floor toms/percussion/keyboard/vocal
Shane Justice McCord – keyboard/glockenspiel/guitar/vocals

Discography
Studio albums
The Dongo Durango (2015, ATO Records)

References

Musical groups from Baltimore